Leroy Jennings (born 3 March 1998) is a Fijian Australian professional football player who plays as a central midfielder for NPL NSW club Sydney United.

Club career

LA Galaxy 
Jennings signed for LA Galaxy academy on a 1-year deal after showing a good performance during trial, impressing the directors and receiving praise from David Beckham.

Wrexham 
After leaving LA Galaxy, Jennings signed for Wrexham in 2014, playing for the academy for two seasons.

Newcastle Jets 
On 27 October 2016, Jennings signed for the Newcastle Jets. He played for the youth team, making 16 appearances and 3 goals in the league.

Wollongong Wolves 
On 24 December 2020, Jennings joined the Wollongong Wolves. During his three year period at the club, Jennings came runners-up in the 2020 NPL NSW season for the Premiership.

Sydney United 
On 17 December 2022, Jennings was announced to play for Sydney United for the 2023 NPL NSW season. On 5 February 2023, He made his United debut against local rivals Marconi where he scored two goals in the second half to win 3-1 at full time.

International career 
Jennings was selected for the Fiji national under-20 team ahead of their 2016 OFC U-20 Championship. Jennings played all three group matches, scoring one goal against New Caledonia but failing to qualify for the knockout rounds.

Jennings rejected the call-up for the Fiji national team, one month before the OFC 2018 FIFA World Cup playoff because of his interest in representing Australia instead.

References

External links
 Leroy Jennings at Football NSW

Living people
1998 births
Australian soccer players
Sydney United 58 FC players
Wollongong Wolves FC players
Blacktown City FC players
Sutherland Sharks FC players